Physodeutera is a genus of beetles in the family Cicindelidae, containing the following species:

 Physodeutera adonis (Castelnau, 1835)
 Physodeutera alluaudi (Fleutiaux, 1903)
 Physodeutera andriai (Rivalier, 1965)
 Physodeutera antsalovensis J.Moravec, 1999
 Physodeutera belalonensis Deuve, 1987
 Physodeutera bellula (Fleutiaux, 1886)
 Physodeutera biguttula (Fairmaire, 1903)
 Physodeutera boraensis J.Moravec, 2000
 Physodeutera bucephala (W.Horn, 1900)
 Physodeutera cassolai J.Moravec, 2002
 Physodeutera catalai (Jeannel, 1946)
 Physodeutera centropunctata (W.Horn, 1934)
 Physodeutera consimilis J.Moravec, 2002
 Physodeutera conturbata J.Moravec, 2002
 Physodeutera cyanea (Audouin & Brulle, 1839)
 Physodeutera debilis Rivalier, 1967
 Physodeutera didysilvae Cassola & Andriamampianina, 2001
 Physodeutera dorri (Fleutiaux, 1899)
 Physodeutera fairmairei (W.Horn, 1899)
 Physodeutera flagellicornis (W.Horn, 1897)
 Physodeutera gigantea (W.Horn, 1913)
 Physodeutera intermedia Rivalier, 1967
 Physodeutera janthina (Fairmaire, 1903)
 Physodeutera lateralis (Olsoufieff, 1934)
 Physodeutera lobicornis J.Moravec, 2000
 Physodeutera longilabialis J.Moravec, 2000
 Physodeutera marginemaculata (W.Horn, 1934)
 Physodeutera maxima (Fleutiaux, 1899)
 Physodeutera megalommoides (W.Horn, 1896)
 Physodeutera minima (W.Horn, 1893)
 Physodeutera mocquerysi (Fleutiaux, 1899)
 Physodeutera murzini J.Moravec, 2004
 Physodeutera natalia (W.horn, 1934)
 Physodeutera parcepunctata (Jeannel, 1946)
 Physodeutera perrieri Rivalier, 1967
 Physodeutera perroti Rivalier, 1967
 Physodeutera peyrierasi Rivalier, 1967
 Physodeutera pokornyi (Maran, 1942)
 Physodeutera pseudorubescens Deuve, 1987
 Physodeutera pseudotrimaculata (W.Horn, 1934)
 Physodeutera punctipennis (Fairmaire, 1903)
 Physodeutera punctum (Rivalier, 1951)
 Physodeutera ranomafanensis J.Moravec, 2002
 Physodeutera rectipenis (W.Horn, 1934)
 Physodeutera rectolabialis (W.Horn, 1913)
 Physodeutera rubescens (Jeannel, 1946)
 Physodeutera rufosignata (Audouin & Brulle, 1839)
 Physodeutera sikorai (W.Horn, 1896)
 Physodeutera skrabali J.Moravec, 1999
 Physodeutera sobrina Rivalier, 1967
 Physodeutera subrufosignata J.Moravec, 2002
 Physodeutera subtilevelutina (W.Horn, 1934)
 Physodeutera sulcoprothoracica (W.Horn, 1914)
 Physodeutera taniae J.Moravec, 2002
 Physodeutera tricolorata (W.Horn, 1934)
 Physodeutera trimaculata (Fleutiaux, 1899)
 Physodeutera truncatipenis J.Moravec, 2002
 Physodeutera umbrosa Rivalier, 1967
 Physodeutera uncifera (Jeannel, 1946)
 Physodeutera uniguttata (Fairmaire, 1871)
 Physodeutera vadoni (Rivalier, 1951)
 Physodeutera virgulata (Fairmaire, 1904)
 Physodeutera viridicyanea (Audouin & Brulle, 1839)
 Physodeutera vybirali J.Moravec, 2000

References

Cicindelidae